The deputy speaker and chairman of committees is a member of the Parliament of Sri Lanka (and its predecessors the National State Assembly, the House of Representatives and the State Council) who presides over sittings of Parliament in the absence of the Speaker. The current deputy speaker and chairman of committees is Ajith Rajapaksa.

List of Deputy speakers and chairmen of committees

References

 
Sri Lanka